The events of 2000 in anime.

Events
In this year, 124 anime television programs were produced.

Accolades  
At the Mainichi Film Awards, Doraemon: A Grandmother's Recollections won the Animation Film Award and Blood: The Last Vampire won the Ōfuji Noburō Award. The Old Man and the Sea won the Grand prix du court métrage at the Annecy International Animated Film Festival.

Releases

See also
2000 in animation

References

External links 
Japanese animated works of the year, listed in the IMDb

Years in anime
2000 in animation
2000 in Japan